Tribune is an unincorporated community in the Rural Municipality of Souris Valley No. 7, Saskatchewan, Canada that held village status prior to 2018. In 2016, the population was 45.

History 
Tribune incorporated as a village on February 18, 1914. It restructured on December 31, 2017, relinquishing its village status in favour of becoming an unincorporated community under the jurisdiction of the Rural Municipality of Souris No. 7.

Demographics 

In the 2016 Census of Population conducted by Statistics Canada, Tribune recorded a population of 45 living in 21 of its 21 total private dwellings, a  change from its 2011 population of 25.

See also 
List of communities in Saskatchewan
List of special service areas in Saskatchewan

References 

Souris Valley No. 7, Saskatchewan
Former villages in Saskatchewan
Unincorporated communities in Saskatchewan
Populated places disestablished in 2017
Division No. 2, Saskatchewan